Olena Ivanivna Pakholchyk (born 2 November 1964 in Pavlodar Region, Kazakh SSR, Soviet Union) is a Ukrainian sailor.

At the 1996 470-European-Sailing-Championship she won with her Partner Ruslana Taran the gold medal.

References

External links
 
 
 
 

1964 births
Living people
Ukrainian female sailors (sport)
People from Pavlodar Region
Kazakhstani people of Belarusian descent
Kazakhstani emigrants to Ukraine
Armed Forces sports society (Ukraine) athletes
Olympic sailors of Ukraine
Olympic bronze medalists for Ukraine
Olympic medalists in sailing
Sailors at the 1992 Summer Olympics – 470
Sailors at the 1996 Summer Olympics – 470
Sailors at the 2000 Summer Olympics – 470
Medalists at the 2000 Summer Olympics
Medalists at the 1996 Summer Olympics
ISAF World Sailor of the Year (female)
470 class world champions
World champions in sailing for Ukraine